The Tallahassee Marathon is a marathon held in Tallahassee, the state capital of Florida, since 1975.

This race is a USATF certified course and an official qualifier for the Boston Marathon.

History 

The marathon was first held in 1975 with just two participants.

The 2016 edition of the race was held on February 7, 2016.

The 2021 edition of the race was cancelled due to the coronavirus pandemic.

Course 

The race starts in Downtown, moves through the Midtown district and through Myers Park. Later, the course passes Cascade Park and the Florida State University campus.

Winners

Men's

Women's

See also

 List of marathon races in North America

References

External links
 

Marathons in the United States
Track and field in Florida
Sports competitions in Florida
Sports in Tallahassee, Florida
February sporting events
Recurring sporting events established in 1975
1975 establishments in Florida